The German Colony (HaMoshava HaGermanit) is a neighborhood in Jerusalem, established in the second half of the 19th century as a German Templer Colony in Palestine. Today the Moshava, as it is popularly known, is an upscale neighborhood bisected by Emek Refaim Street, an avenue lined with trendy shops, restaurants and cafes.

History

Biblical era
Valley of Rephaim is mentioned in the Book of Joshua and in the Second Book of Samuel. The name is derived from a legendary race of giants who lived in this region in biblical times.

Templer settlement

In 1873, after establishing colonies in Haifa and Jaffa, members of the Templer sect from Württemberg, Germany, settled on a large tract of land in the Refaim Valley, southwest of the Old City of Jerusalem. The land was purchased by one of the colonists, Matthäus Frank, from the Arabs of Beit Safafa. The Templers were Christians who broke away from the Protestant church and encouraged their members to settle in the Holy Land to prepare for Messianic salvation. They built their homes in the style to which they were accustomed in Germany - farmhouses of one or two stories, with slanting tiled roofs and shuttered windows, but using local materials such as Jerusalem stone instead of wood and bricks. The colonists engaged in agriculture and traditional trades such as carpentry and blacksmithing. Their homes ran along  two parallel streets that would become Emek Refaim and Bethlehem Road. Friedrich (Fritz) Kübler, a German-born butcher, settled in the Germany Colony in 1870. He raised livestock there and built a slaughterhouse on his property. His son took over  the meat business after the father's death and became one of the largest meat suppliers in Jerusalem. His clients were hotels, monasteries, hostels and hospitals. An apartment in the Kübler house,  on Adolphe Cremieux Street, which still has a water trough in the yard, was purchased by former Prime Minister of Israel, Ehud Olmert.       

The British Mandatory government deported the German Templers during World War II. As some of them sympathized with the German Nazi regime, they were considered enemy citizens. Some of them resettled in Australia.

Christian Arab settlement
As the neighborhood expanded south along the valley, many of the lots were purchased by well-to-do Christian Arab families attracted by its location between the road to Bethlehem and the developing neighborhoods of Katamon, Talbiya, and Baka, which were populated by some of Jerusalem's wealthiest Arabs.

One of the most famous Christian families in Hebron (Khalil) is Abu Gharbieh, which helped to improve the foundations of the city.

State of Israel
The Arab residents of Katamon fled in 1948, in the wake of fierce battles for control of the area during the Arab–Israeli War. The abandoned homes in the German Colony and other parts of Katamon were used to house new immigrants. Since the end of the 20th century, the neighborhood has undergone a process of gentrification. Efforts are being made to restore old landmark buildings and incorporate some of their architectural features, such as arched windows and tiled roofs, in new construction. Numerous cafes, bars, restaurants, and boutiques have opened in the neighborhood, and many affluent families have moved there, pushing up the price of real estate. The German Colony has a large English-speaking population, with the English speaking community comprising both families and singles, permanent immigrants and visitors. The neighborhood was home to the Smadar Theater, once a gathering place for the artisterati.

During the Second Intifada, in September 2003, a Palestinian suicide bomber blew himself up outside Café Hillel on Emek Refaim Street, killing seven people. In February 2004, another suicide bombing took place on bus #14a as it was leaving the neighborhood northwards. Eight were killed. A small stone monument was erected on top of the fence of the old train station, facing the location of the attack. It is visible from the main northern entrance to the German Colony, across from Liberty Bell Park.

Architecture and street names

The colorful history of the German Colony is illustrated by the mix of architectural styles found within a relatively small area. One finds Swabian-style homes, examples of late provincial Ottoman architecture and British Art Deco from the Mandatory period, within close proximity. An example of British architecture is the Scottish Hospice and St Andrew's Church, built in 1927, decorated with local Armenian tilework. Some of the Templer homes have biblical inscriptions in German on their lintels, in Fraktur script.

The side streets of the German Colony are named for Gentile supporters of Zionism and the Jewish people. Apart from the French author Émile Zola, Czech president Tomas Masaryk, Adolphe Crémieux and South African prime minister Jan Smuts, many of the streets are named for Britons: Liberal Prime Minister David Lloyd George, British Labour Party MP Josiah Wedgwood, Colonel John Henry Patterson, commander of the Jewish Legion in World War I, and pro-Zionist British general Wyndham Deedes.

Parks and recreation 
The Park HaMesila (Train Track Park) runs along the German Colony's southern border with Baka. This former train track was converted into a park approximately 7 km in length and the portion that borders the German Colony has been extensively landscaped. There is a 'Bus Stop Library' located at the junction of the park and Masaryk Street where residents can donate unwanted books or find reading material.

Landmarks 

 Gemeindehaus, communal hall - 1 Emek Refaim Street
 Friedrich Aberle House - 10 Emek Refaim Street
 Matthäus Frank House - 6 Emek Refaim Street
 Pension Schmidt
 Lev Smadar Theater - formerly Orient Cinema, Lloyd George Street
 Convent of Borromean Sisters - 12 Lloyd George Street
 Templer Cemetery - 39 Emek Refaim Street
 Imberger House
 Shalom Hartman Institute - 11 Gedalyahu Alon Street
 Kivunim Gap Year Headquarters, Yemin Moshe Street

Development plans
For years, developers tried to build up the area at the northern entrance to the neighborhood, overlooking Liberty Bell Park. Mass protests in the early 1970s failed to halt the construction of a high-rise apartment building, known as the Omariya compound. In the wake of protests by environmentalists and neighborhood activists, the plans were altered, and the height of a planned 14-story hotel was cut to seven stories.

Notable residents
Batya Gur, Israeli novelist
Charles Winters, American businessman

References

Arab culture in Jerusalem
Arab Christian communities in Israel
German diaspora in Jerusalem
Templer settlements
Late modern history of Jerusalem
Neighbourhoods of Jerusalem
Populated places established in the 19th century
1873 establishments in Ottoman Syria